Lycaea or Lykaia, also known as Lycoa or Lykoa (Λυκόα), was a town in the northwest of ancient Arcadia not far from the river Alpheius, near its junction with the Lusius or Gortynius, at the foot of Mount Lycaeus. Pausanias writes of the Lycaeatae (Λυκαιᾶται) as a people in the district of Cynuria, and Stephanus of Byzantium mentions the town.

Its site is unlocated.

References

Populated places in ancient Arcadia
Former populated places in Greece
Lost ancient cities and towns